Mary Augusta Wakefield (19 August 1853 – 16 September 1910) was a British composer, contralto, festival organiser, and writer.

Biography

Early life 
Wakefield was born in Kendal, where her paternal ancestors had been members of the Quaker community before converting to Anglicanism. Her mother was from an Irish-American background. In the 1860s her father took over the family business, which included a bank and a gunpowder mill. He built Sedgwick House near the gunpowder mill a few miles outside Kendal. Her parents William Henry Wakefield and Augusta Hagarty Wakefield had four sons (including the cricketer William Wakefield) and two other daughters. 

As a child, Wakefield learned traditional border folksongs from her nurses, which she later included in her collection Northern Songs. As a teenager she was sent to a finishing school in Brighton.
She studied in London with Alberto Randegger and George Henschel, and in Rome with Giovanni Sgambati.

Later life 
Wakefield corresponded with and visited many musicians and writers, including Lucy Broadwood, J. A. Fuller Maitland, Herbert Oakeley, John Ruskin, John Stainer, and Maude Valérie White. Author Vernon Lee dedicated her short ghost story A Wicked Voice to Wakefield in 1887.

Music 

Wakefield was an early member of the Folk Song Society (now the English Folk Dance and Song Society). She presented recitals throughout England, sometimes with Maude Valerie White. While in Rome in the 1880s, she socialised with composers Theo Marzials and Edvard Grieg. Grieg coached her on singing his songs and gave her an album of his compositions with this inscription: "Mary Wakefield with my best thanks for her beautiful songs. Edward Grieg. Roma. 1887."

Wakefield's musical compositions included:

Vocal music 

After Years
Beyond All, Thine
Bunch of Cowslips
Children are Singing
Courting Days
For Love's Sake Only
Lass and Lad
Leafy June
Life Time and Love Time
Little Roundhead Maid
Love's Service
Love that Goes A-Courting
May Time in Midwinter (text by Algernon Charles Swinburne)
Milkmaid (text by Henry Austin Dobson)
Molly Maloney (text by Alfred Perceval Graves)
Moonspell
More and More
Nancy
No Sir!
Northern Songs (collection)
Queen of Sixty Years (for chorus)
Serenade
Shaking Grass
Shearing Day
Sweet Sally Gray
When the Boys Come Home
Yes Sir!
You May

Writing and lectures 
Wakefield knew John Ruskin, whose many interests included music. Towards the end of his life she edited a collection of his observations on the subject, Ruskin on Music (1894). She presented lectures and wrote articles about various musical topics. Several of her articles were published in Murray's Magazine from July to December, 1889, under the title Foundation Stones of English Music . The topics of her lectures and articles included:
English National Melody in the 13th, i4th, and i5th Centuries: Monks and Minstrels
English Melody under Elizabeth, Including Contemporary Settings of Some of Shakespeare's Songs
English Melody in the i7th Century: Cavaliers and Roundheads
English Melody in the i8th Century
Irish National Melodies
Jubilee Lecture on Victorian Song
Madrigal Time
Scotch National Melodies
Shakespeare's Songs and their Musical Settings
Skene and Straloch Lute Manuscripts
Songs of Four Nations (England, Scotland, Ireland, and Wales)
Songs of Handel
Songs of Schubert
Songs of Schumann

Festivals 

Wakefield started several choirs in villages around Kendal, near her family home. In 1885, with her sister Agnes, she brought the choirs together for an outdoor festival to raise money for her local parish church St Thomas', Crosscrake, which had been built with support from her father. In addition to raising money for the church, Wakefield wanted to encourage local, amateur music and make music more important in English life.

Legacy 
Her festival continues today as the Mary Wakefield Westmorland Festival, and has inspired similar music festivals in other English towns. When Wakefield died in 1910, the Association of Musical Competition Festivals created a Mary Wakefield medal to be awarded at English music festivals. The medal included an image of Wakefield and Martin Luther's quotation "Music is a fair and glorious gift from God." 

In 2003, a plaque was erected at Wakefield Bank House, Stricklandgate, Kendal, to celebrate the 150th anniversary of Wakefield's birth and commemorate her pioneering work developing English music festivals.

References

External links 
 download songs by Mary Augusta Wakefield
 read Mary Wakefield: A Memoir by Rosa Newmarch
 Mary Wakefield Westmorland Festival website

19th-century British women writers
20th-century British women writers
British women classical composers
British writers about music
19th-century British women singers
Music festival founders
1853 births
1910 deaths